The 2019–20 season was the 96th season in the existence of AEK Athens F.C. and the 59th competitive season and fifth consecutive in the top flight of Greek football. They competed in the Super League, the Greek Cup and the Europa League. The season began on 8 August 2019 and finished on 12 September 2020.

Players

Squad information

NOTE: The players are the ones that have been announced by the AEK Athens' press release. No edits should be made unless a player arrival or exit is announced. Updated 12 September 2020, 23:59 UTC+3.

Transfers

In

Summer

Winter

Out

Summer

Winter

Loan in

Summer

Winter

Loan out

Summer

Winter

Notes

 a.  Plus 30% resale fee.

Renewals

Overall transfer activity

Expenditure
Summer:  €2,400,000

Winter:  €1,100,000

Total:  €3,500,000

Income
Summer:  €800,000

Winter:  €0

Total:  €800,000

Net Totals
Summer:  €1,600,000

Winter:  €1,100,000

Total:  €2,700,000

Pre-season and friendlies

Super League Greece

Regular season

League table

Results by Matchday

Fixtures

Play-offs

Table

Results by Matchday

Fixtures

Greek Cup

AEK Athens entered the Greek Cup at the sixth round.

Round of 16

Quarter-finals

Semi-finals

Final

UEFA Europa League

AEK Athens entered the Europa League at the third qualifying round.

Third qualifying round

Play-off Round

Statistics

Squad statistics

! colspan="13" style="background:#FFDE00; text-align:center" | Goalkeepers
|-

! colspan="13" style="background:#FFDE00; color:black; text-align:center;"| Defenders
|-

! colspan="13" style="background:#FFDE00; color:black; text-align:center;"| Midfielders
|-

! colspan="13" style="background:#FFDE00; color:black; text-align:center;"| Forwards
|-

! colspan="13" style="background:#FFDE00; color:black; text-align:center;"| Left during Winter Transfer Window
|-

|-
|}

Disciplinary record

|-
! colspan="20" style="background:#FFDE00; text-align:center" | Goalkeepers

|-
! colspan="20" style="background:#FFDE00; color:black; text-align:center;"| Defenders

|-
! colspan="20" style="background:#FFDE00; color:black; text-align:center;"| Midfielders

|-
! colspan="20" style="background:#FFDE00; color:black; text-align:center;"| Forwards

|-
! colspan="20" style="background:#FFDE00; color:black; text-align:center;"| Left during Winter Transfer window

|-
|}

Starting 11

References

External links
AEK Athens F.C. Official Website

AEK Athens F.C. seasons
AEK Athens
AEK Athens